A church tax is a tax collected by the state from members of some religious denominations to provide financial support of churches, such as the salaries of its clergy and to pay the operating cost of the church. 

The constitution of a number of countries could be and have been interpreted as both supporting and prohibiting the levying of taxes unto churches; prohibiting church tax could separate church and state fiscally, but it could also be favorable treatment by the government.

Austria 
Every recognized religious group in Austria can collect church tax at a rate of 1.1%, though currently only the Catholic and Protestant Church make use of that opportunity. Church tax is compulsory for Catholics in Austria. This tax was introduced by Adolf Hitler in 1939. After World War II, the tax was retained in order to keep the Church independent of political powers.

Denmark 

The members of the national Church of Denmark pay a church tax, called "kirkeskat". The rate varies among municipalities with a minimum of 0.4% and a maximum of 1.3% of taxable income in 2019. The tax is generally around 0.7% of taxable income. The collection of the church tax is administered by the Danish tax authorities, but the church tax is not considered as a genuine tax by, for example, Statistics Denmark, but as a "voluntary transfer from households to the state".

The church tax does not cover the entire budget of the Church of Denmark. An additional 9% is paid by the government through block grants ("bloktilskud"), which means that people who are not members of the Church of Denmark also finance its activities through taxes.

England
Excerpts from Sir William Blackstone, Commentaries on the Laws of England:

Definition and classification and those liable to pay tithes
. . . tithes; which are defined to be the tenth part of the increase, yearly arising and renewing from the profits of lands, the stock upon lands, and the personal industry of the inhabitants:
the first species being usually called predial, as of corn, grass, hops, and wood;
the second mixed, as of wool, milk, pigs, &c, consisting of natural products, but nurtured and preserved in part by the care of man; and of these the tenth must be paid in gross:
the third personal, as of manual occupations, trades, fisheries, and the like; and of these only the tenth part of the clear gains and profits is due.
...
in general, tithes are to be paid for every thing that yields an annual increase, as corn, hay, fruit, cattle, poultry, and the like; but not for any thing that is of the substance of the earth, or is not of annual increase, as stone, lime, chalk, and the like; nor for creatures that are of a wild nature, or ferae naturae, as deer, hawks, &c, whose increase, so as to profit the owner, is not annual, but casual.

History
We cannot precisely ascertain the time when tithes were first introduced into this country.  Possibly they were contemporary with the planting of Christianity among the Saxons, by Augustin the monk, about the end of the fifth century.  But the first mention of them, which I have met with in any written English law, is in a constitutional decree, made in a synod held A.D. 786, wherein the payment of tithes in general is strongly enjoined. This canon, or decree, which at first bound not the laity, was effectually confirmed by two kingdoms of the heptarchy, in their parliamentary conventions of estates, respectively consisting of the kings of Mercia and Northumberland, the bishops, dukes, senators, and people. Which was a few years later than the time that Charlemagne established the payment of them in France, and made that famous division of them into four parts; one to maintain the edifice of the church, the second to support the poor, the third the bishop, and the fourth the parochial clergy.

Beneficiaries
And upon their first introduction (as hath formerly been observed), though every man was obliged to pay tithes in general, yet he might give them to what priests he pleased; which were called arbitrary consecrations of tithes: or he might pay them into the hands of the bishop, who distributed among his diocesan clergy the revenues of the church, which were then in common. But, when dioceses were divided into parishes, the tithes of each parish were allotted to its own particular minister; first by common consent, or the appointment of lords of manors, and afterwards by the written law of the land.

...It is now universally held, that tithes are due, of common right, to the parson of the parish, unless there be a special exemption. This parson of the parish, we have formerly seen, may be either the actual incumbent, or else the appropriator of the benefice: appropriations being a method of endowing monasteries, which seems to have been devised by the regular clergy, by way of substitution to arbitrary consecrations of tithes.

Exemptions
We observed that tithes are due to the parson of common right, unless by special exemption: let us therefore see, thirdly, who may be exempted from the payment of tithes ... either in part or totally, first, by a real composition; or secondly, by custom or prescription.

First, a real composition is when an agreement is made between the owner of the lands, and the parson or vicar, with the consent of the ordinary and the patron, that such lands shall for the future be discharged from payment of tithes, by reason of some land or other real recompence given to the parson, in lieu and satisfaction thereof.

Secondly, a discharge by custom or prescription, is where time out of mind such persons or such lands have been, either partially or totally, discharged from the payment of tithes. And this immemorial usage is binding upon all parties, as it is in its nature an evidence of universal consent and acquiescence; and with reason supposes a real composition to have been formerly made. This custom or prescription is either de modo decimandi, or de non-decimando.

A modus decimandi, commonly called by the simple name of a modus only, is where there is by custom a particular manner of tithing allowed, different from the general law of taking tithes in kind, which are the actual tenth part of the annual increase. This is sometimes a pecuniary compensation, as twopence an acre for the tithe of land : sometimes it is a compensation in work and labour, as that the parson shall have only the twelfth cock of hay, and not the tenth, in consideration of the owner's making it for him: sometimes, in lieu of a large quantity of crude or imperfect tithe, the parson shall have a less quantity, when arrived to greater maturity, as a couple of fowls in lieu of tithe eggs; and the like. Any means, in short, whereby the general law of tithing is altered, and a new method of taking them is introduced, is called a modus decimandi, or special manner of tithing.

A prescription de non-decimando is a claim to be entirely discharged of tithes, and to pay no compensation in lieu of them.  Thus the king by his prerogative is discharged from all tithes. So a vicar shall pay no tithes to the rector, nor the rector to the vicar, for ecclesia decimas non-folvit ecclesiae. But these personal to both the king and the clergy; for their tenant or lessee shall pay tithes of the same land, though in their own occupation it is not tithable.  And, generally speaking, it is an established rule, that in lay hands, modus de non-decimando non-valet. But spiritual persons or corporations, as monasteries, abbots, bishops, and the like, were always capable of having their lands totally discharged of tithes, by various ways: as
By real composition :
By the pope's bull of exemption :
By unity of possession; as when the rectory of a parish, and lands in the same parish, both belonged to a religious house, those lands were discharged of tithes by this unity of possession :
By prescription; having never been liable to tithes, by being always in spiritual hands :
By virtue of their order; as the knights templars, cistercians, and others, whose lands were privileged by the pope with a discharge of tithes. Though, upon the dissolution of abbeys by Henry VIII, most of these exemptions from tithes would have fallen with them, and the lands become tithable again; had they not been supported and upheld by the statute 31 Hen. VIII. c. 13. which enacts, that all persons who should come to the possession of the lands of any abbey then dissolved, should hold them free and discharged of tithes, in as large and ample a manner as the abbeys themselves formerly held them. And from this original have sprung all the lands, which, being in lay hands, do at present claim to be tithe-free: for, if a man can shew his lands to have been such abbey lands, and also immemorially discharged of tithes by any of the means before-mentioned, this is now a good prescription de non-decimando. But he must shew both these requisites; for abbey lands, without a special ground of discharge, are not discharged of course; neither will any prescription de non-decimando avail in total discharge of tithes, unless it relates to such abbeylands.

Finland 
All members of either the Evangelical Lutheran Church of Finland and the Finnish Orthodox Church (the two state churches of Finland) pay an income-based church tax of between 1% and 2%, depending on the municipality. On average the tax is about 1.4%.

Formerly, to stop paying church tax, one had to formally leave the church by personally going to local register office and waiting during an allowance of time for reflection. This requirement was removed in 2003 and currently a written (but not signed) statement to the church suffices. The majority of resignations since 2005 are now handled through a web site, Eroakirkosta.fi. If one is a member of the church when the year begins, they will pay taxes for the whole year. Studies show that church membership resignations in Finland are mainly due to the general secularization of society, not because of tax avoidance.

Germany 

About 70% of church revenues come from church tax (Kirchensteuer), also called worship tax (Kultussteuer) when referring to non-Christian religious bodies such as Jewish synagogues. This is about €9.2 billion (in 2010).

Article 137 of the Weimar Constitution of 1919 and article 140 of the German Basic Law of 1949 form the legal bases for this practice.

In Germany, on the basis of tax regulations passed by the religious communities and within the limits set by state laws, communities may either
 require the taxation authorities of the state to collect the fees from the members on the basis of income tax assessment (then, the authorities withhold a collection fee), or
 choose to collect the church tax themselves.

In the first case, membership in the religious community is stored in a database at the Federal Tax Office which employers receive excerpts of for the purpose of withholding tax on paid income. If an employee's data indicate membership in a tax-collecting religious community, the employer must withhold church tax prepayments from their income in addition to other tax prepayments. In connection with the final annual income tax assessment, the state revenue authorities also finally assess the church tax owed. In the case of self-employed persons or of unemployed taxpayers, state revenue authorities collect prepayments on the church tax together with prepayments on the income tax.

If, however, religious communities choose to collect church tax themselves, they may demand that the tax authorities reveal taxation data of their members to calculate the contributions and prepayments owed. In particular, some smaller communities (e.g., the Jewish Community of Berlin) choose to collect taxes themselves to save collection fees the government would charge otherwise.

Collection of church tax may be used to cover any church-related expenses such as funding institutions and foundations or paying ministers.

The church tax is only paid by members of the respective church, although the concept of “membership” is far from clear, and it may be asked what right the secular state has to tell the faithful what contribution they should make to their own denomination. People who are not members of a church tax-collecting denomination do not have to pay it. Members of a religious community under public law may formally declare their wish to leave the community to state (not religious) authorities. The obligation to pay church taxes ends once such a declaration has been made. Some communities refuse to administer marriages and burials of (former) members who had declared to leave it.

The money flow of state and churches is distinct at all levels of the procedures. The church tax is not meant to be a way for the state to directly support churches, but since expenses for church tax are fully deductible (as are voluntary expenses for the Church, for charity or a bundle of other privileged aims) in fact such support occurs on a somewhat large scale. The effort of collecting itself, done by the State, is entirely paid for by the Churches with a part of the tax income.

The church tax is historically rooted in the pre-Christian Germanic custom where the chief of the tribe was directly responsible for the maintenance of priests and religious groups. During the Christianization of Western Europe, this custom was adopted by the Christian churches (Arian and Catholic) in the concept of "Eigenkirchen" (churches owned by the landlord) which stood in strong contrast to the central church organization of the Roman Catholic Church. Despite the resulting medieval conflict between emperor and pope, the concept of church maintenance by the ruler remained the accepted custom in most Western European countries. In Reformation times, the local princes in Germany became officially heads of the church in Protestant areas and were legally responsible for the maintenance of churches. Not until the 19th century, were the finances of churches and state regulated to a point where the churches became financially independent. At this point, the church tax was introduced to replace the state benefits the churches had obtained previously.

The church tax was reaffirmed in Article 13 of the Reichskonkordat between Nazi Germany and the Vatican, where it is understood that the right of the Church to levy taxes is guaranteed. Taxpayers, whether Roman Catholic, Protestant or members of other tax-collecting communities, pay an amount equal to between 8% (in Bavaria and Baden-Württemberg) and 9% (in the rest of the country) of their income tax to the church or other community to which they belong.

For example, a single person earning €50,000 may pay an average income-tax of 20%, thus €10,000. The church tax is then an additional 8% (or 9%) of that €10,000 (€800 or €900) for a total of €10,800 or €10,900 in taxes.

In 2017, Germany’s Catholic church recorded approximately €6 billion split across its 27 different dioceses, also known as church districts. This is in spite of the massive dip in attendance. According to the national German newspaper Handelsblatt, church attendance has dropped by more than 2.2 million attendees since the start of the millennium. Contrasted to 50 years prior, where attendance totaled over 11 million, the numbers are now a mere 2.5 million Catholics. The German Church also has a total fortune of at least €20 billion. The three highest profiting dioceses are Paderborn, at €3.5 billion, Munich at €2.8 billion, and Cologne at €2.6 billion. Despite the extreme success of this bill on forcing tax payment, many citizens still find ways to stay away from paying for it. When moving to Germany, one must fill out a form declaring religious affiliation and denomination. One can also manage to opt out of the tax at a later date, if they are a non-practicing member of their faith. This has led to many people declaring they have abandoned the religion of their birth. There is currently no data available regarding what proportion of those making such a declaration have in fact abandoned their religion, or whether they make the claim only to avoid paying the tax.

Iceland 
Taxpayers in Iceland who belong to an officially registered religious group or secular humanist organization  must pay a congregation tax (Icelandic: sóknargjald, plural sóknargjöld) which is deducted from income taxes and goes to the individual's respective organization. In the past, the sóknargjald of those who do not belong to any recognized religious organization went to the University of Iceland, but this was changed in 2009. In cases of individuals not belonging to a registered religious group or secular humanist organization, the amount that would otherwise be used for the sóknargjald remains now part of the income tax budget. In 2015, the monthly sóknargjald amounted to 824 Icelandic krónur, about $US6. In March 2021, Judaism was added to Iceland’s list of state-recognised religious groups.

The Church of Iceland receives governmental support beyond the congregation taxes paid by its members.

Italy 

Taxpayers in Italy pay a mandatory eight per thousand tax, and have the option to choose to whom they will assign the funds. This tax amounts to 0.8% of the total income tax (IRPEF) and every taxpayer can choose the recipient of the contribution on their tax form. Regardless of whether the taxpayer expresses a preference or not, the 0.8% is already included in their tax levy.

Currently the choices are: 
 Italian State
 Roman Catholic Church
 Waldensian Evangelical Church
 Seventh-day Adventist Church
 Assemblies of God in Italy
 Union of the Jewish Communities in Italy
 Lutheran Evangelical Church in Italy
 Baptist Evangelical Christian Union of Italy
 Greek Orthodox Archdiocese of Italy
 Apostolic Church in Italy (Pentecostalism)
 Italian Buddhist Union
 Italian Hindu Union

If the choice is not expressly declared on the tax form, the tax is distributed according to the percentages of the taxpayers who have declared their choice of beneficiary. While it was intended that the state should use its own share of the 0.8% tax for social or cultural purposes, in practice it has employed it for general purposes including its military mission in Iraq in 2004 and the upgrading of prison infrastructure in 2011.

Spain 
The Spanish tax declation form has one checkbox for the Catholic Church, none for other religious groups and a second checkbox for activities of social interest. These checkboxes don't influence the total tax amount, but make that for each ticked checkbox 0.7% of the total amount are used as indicated.

Sweden 
The members of Church of Sweden pay church fee, which varies between municipalities, but can be as much as 2%. Church and state are separated as of 2000; however, the burial tax (begravningsavgift) is paid by everyone regardless of membership.

In a recent development, the Swedish government has agreed to continue collecting from individual taxpayers the annual payment that has always gone to the church. But now the fee will be an optional checkoff box on the tax return. The government will allocate the money collected to Catholic, Muslim, Jewish and other faiths as well as the Lutherans, with each taxpayer directing where his or her taxes should go.

Switzerland 
There is no official state church in Switzerland. However, except Geneva and Neuchâtel, each canton (state) financially supports at least one of the three traditional denominations – Roman Catholic, Old Catholic (in Switzerland Christian Catholic Church of Switzerland), or Evangelical Reformed – with funds collected through taxation. Each canton church tax may formally have to leave the church. In some cantons private companies are unable to avoid payment of the church tax.

In Geneva and Neuchâtel there is no church tax : each taxpayer is free to make a voluntary tax deductible contribution or gift to his church, either directly to the beneficiary or using the canton (state) tax system.

United States 

In the United States, churches are generally exempt from paying taxes. The United States Supreme Court has held that tax exemption for churches is constitutional under the Establishment Clause  and that churches and religious organizations may be subject to a general sales and use tax; however, the Court has not addressed whether government may enact a specific "church tax". The Establishment Clause of the US Constitution prohibits the US federal government and (through incorporation doctrine) the 50 state governments from establishing a state religion or favoring one religion over another.

Prior to American independence, most of the original colonies supported religious activities with taxes, with each colony often choosing a single church as their official religion. These official churches enjoyed privileges not granted to other religious groups. Massachusetts and Connecticut supported the Congregational church through tax. In colonial South Carolina, the Anglican Church benefited from church taxes. Other colonies would more generally support religion by requiring taxes that would partially fund religious institutions - taxpayers could direct payments to the Protestant denomination of their choosing. Only the colonies of Delaware, New Jersey, Pennsylvania and Rhode Island did not require a tax to support religion. During and after the American Revolution, religious minorities, such as the Methodists and the Baptists, argued that taxes to support religion violated freedoms won from the British. Defenders of the practice argued that government needed to fund religious institutions because public virtue depended on these institutions which could not survive purely on private support.

See also
Concordat
501(c)(3) recognition, federal tax code exemptions for churches, similar religious entities, and other recognized non-profit groups in the United States
Clergy housing allowance, income not subject to federal tax that is paid to ordained ministers in both Canada and the United States
Otto per mille
Peter's Pence
State religion
Tithe

References

Christianity and government
Personal taxes
Religious taxation
Catholic Church and finance
Religious law